Lucas Alfonso Orbán Alegre (born 3 February 1989) is an Argentine professional footballer who plays as a centre-back for Racing Club.

Club career

River Plate
Born in Buenos Aires, Orbán graduated from local giants River Plate's youth system, and made his professional debut on 24 May 2009, starting in a 2–0 home win over Independiente.

Tigre
On 12 August 2011, after being sparingly used by River, Orbán was loaned to Tigre for the season. He appeared regularly for the latter, and scored his first professional goal on 19 August 2013, but in a 2–3 loss against former club River.

Bordeaux
On 31 July 2013 Orban signed a four-year deal with Ligue 1 side Girondins de Bordeaux. He made his debut in the competition on 13 September, starting in a 0–2 home loss against Paris Saint-Germain.

Valencia
On 11 August 2014, Orbán signed a five-year deal with La Liga's Valencia CF. He made his debut in the competition on 23 August, coming on as a late substitute and scoring an equalizer in a 1–1 away draw against Sevilla FC.

On 31 January 2016, Valencia reached an agreement to loan Orbán to Levante UD until 30 June 2016.

Genoa
On 31 August 2016, Orbán signed for Italian club Genoa.

Racing Club 
In 2020, Orbán signed for Argentine club Racing club for a reported £7,000 per week contract.

International career
On 13 November 2013, Orbán was called up to Argentina national football team by manager Alejandro Sabella, for the matches against Ecuador and Bosnia and Herzegovina. He made his international debut two days later, starting in a 0–0 draw.
On March 28, 2015 he earned his 2nd cap in a 2-0 win over El Salvador.

References

External links

1989 births
Living people
Footballers from Buenos Aires
Argentine footballers
Association football defenders
Argentine Primera División players
Club Atlético River Plate footballers
Club Atlético Tigre footballers
Racing Club de Avellaneda footballers
Ligue 1 players
FC Girondins de Bordeaux players
La Liga players
Valencia CF players
Levante UD footballers
Serie A players
Genoa C.F.C. players
Argentine expatriate footballers
Argentine expatriate sportspeople in France
Expatriate footballers in France
Argentine expatriate sportspeople in Spain
Expatriate footballers in Spain
Argentine expatriate sportspeople in Italy
Expatriate footballers in Italy
Argentina international footballers
Argentine people of Hungarian descent